John David Bartholomew (born September 5, 1986) is an American chess player, International Master, YouTuber and entrepreneur. As of 2021, he resides in Minnesota.

Chess career 

In 2002, Bartholomew won the National High School Chess Championship, and in 2006 became an International Master (IM). He studied at the University of Texas, Dallas on a chess-based full ride scholarship, which he earned at the age of 14. After leaving law school, he became the coach of David Floeder, a middle school student who won the National K-12 U.S. Chess Federation Championship in 2012.  Bartholomew earned his first Grandmaster norm at the Saint Louis Classic in 2013. He is a four-time winner of the Okoboji Open.

He has a dedicated YouTube channel of instructional chess videos and is one of the most popular chess YouTubers. He is the co-founder with David Kramaley of Chessable, a chess education website dedicated to learning chess in a systematic manner. The project was launched in November 2015 and the website was officially launched on February 22, 2016. In September 2019, the company joined forces with an existing merger of Play Magnus AS and Chess24.com.

In January 2018, Bartholomew earned clear first place in the Charlotte Chess Center's Winter 2018 GM Norm Invitational held in Charlotte, North Carolina with an undefeated score of 6.0/9.

In 2019, Bartholomew was inducted into the Minnesota Chess Hall of Fame.

References

External links
 
 His Lichess page

American chess players
1986 births
People from Minnesota
Twitch (service) streamers
Living people